Jeník is a Czech family name:
 :cs:Jan Jeník z Bratřic (1756–1845), Czech knight
 :cs:Miroslav Jeník (1960), Czech politician
 John Joseph Jenik (born 1944), U.S. Catholic bishop
 Štěpán Jeník (1993), Czech ice-hockey player
 a fictional character in The Bartered Bride

Czech-language surnames